Crassispira woodringi is an extinct species of sea snail, a marine gastropod mollusk in the family Pseudomelatomidae, the turrids and allies. Fossils have been found in Eocene strata in Northern Peru; age range: 40.4 to 37.2 Ma.

† Crassispira woodringi (A. Dey, 1961) (synonym: † Drillia (Crassispira) woodringi Dey 1961 is a junior homonym.

References

 A. A. Olsson. 1930. Contributions to the Tertiary Paleontology of Northern Peru: Part 3, Eocene Mollusca. Bulletins of American Paleontology 17(62):1-164

woodringi
Gastropods described in 1930